Altenkunstadt is a municipality in the district of Lichtenfels in Bavaria, Germany. It lies on the left or south bank of the river Main across the valley from Burgkunstadt which sits on the hillside to the north.

Sons and daughters
 Wolfgang Mack (1808-1883), German surgeon 
 Alfred Nikolaus Witt (1914-1999), orthopedist and surgeon, university professor in Berlin and Munich
 Josef Seiz (1934-2010), German table tennis player

References

Lichtenfels (district)